Elorz or Elortz is a locality and council located in the municipality of Noáin, in Navarre province, Spain, Spain. As of 2020, it has a population of 293.

Geography 
Elorz is located 14km southeast of Pamplona.

References

Populated places in Navarre